William Skey (April 8, 1835 – October 4, 1900) was a New Zealand chemist and poet. He was born in London, England in 1835.

References

Further reading
 William Skey (1935-1900); a Centenary in the History of Solvent Extraction, 1967, Chemistry and Industry, p 1780 
 In Memoriam, 1902, Transactions of the Royal Society of New Zealand, p 554 

1835 births
1900 deaths
New Zealand chemists
Scientists from London
English emigrants to New Zealand